Kenton Locke St. John (born January 31, 1993) is an American professional baseball relief pitcher in the Minnesota Twins organization. He has previously played in Major League Baseball (MLB) for the Texas Rangers and Chicago Cubs.

Career
St. John attended Pell City High School in Pell City, Alabama. He played college baseball at Southern Union Community College for two years and then transferred to the University of South Alabama for one season. He was drafted by the Detroit Tigers in the 32nd round, with the 970th overall selection, of the 2014 MLB draft.

Detroit Tigers
St. John spent the 2014 through 2017 seasons in the Tigers organization. During his time with them, he played for the GCL Tigers, Connecticut Tigers, West Michigan Whitecaps, and Lakeland Flying Tigers. During the 2017 season, he converted from a conventional over the top pitcher, into a side-armer.

Texas Rangers
St. John was selected by the Texas Rangers in the Triple-A phase of the 2017 Rule 5 draft. He split the 2018 season between the Down East Wood Ducks of the Class A-Advanced Carolina League and the Frisco RoughRiders Double-A Texas League, going a combined 6–3 with a 2.67 ERA in 60.2 innings. He opened the 2019 season back with Frisco, and on June 6 he was promoted to the Nashville Sounds of the Triple-A Pacific Coast League. Between the two levels, St. John went 5–4 with a 4.38 ERA in 48 innings. 

On June 20, 2019, St. John had his contract selected and he was promoted to the major leagues. He made his major league debut on June 25, retiring the two batters he faced. On September 1, 2019, St. John was designated for assignment after going 0–0 with a 5.40 ERA over 6.2 innings. He was outrighted to Nashville on September 3. He became a free agent on November 2, 2020.

Detroit Tigers (second stint)
On January 4, 2021, St. John signed a minor league contract with the Detroit Tigers. Over 36 games for the Toledo Mud Hens in 2021, he posted a 2.58 ERA.

Chicago Cubs
On November 29, 2021, St. John signed a minor league contract with the Chicago Cubs. He was assigned to the Triple-A Iowa Cubs to begin the season, posting a 5.14 ERA across five appearances. On April 16, 2022, the Cubs selected St. John's contract. St. John appeared in 1 game for Chicago, but surrendered 3 runs off of 2 home runs against the Milwaukee Brewers. He was designated for assignment on May 3 following the promotion of Robert Gsellman.

New York Mets
On May 10, 2022, St. John was claimed off waivers from the Chicago Cubs by the New York Mets, who designated him for assignment. The team opened up a spot on the 40-man roster for St. John when Jacob deGrom was transferred to the 60-day IL. He didn’t appear in a major league game for New York before he was designated for assignment on June 26. He spent the remainder of the season with the Triple-A Syracuse Mets, struggling to a 2-5 record and 6.00 ERA with 25 strikeouts in 42.0 innings pitched across 29 appearances. On October 14, St. John elected to become a free agent.

Minnesota Twins
On February 3, 2023, St. John signed a minor league contract with the Minnesota Twins organization.

See also
 Rule 5 draft results

References

External links

South Alabama Jaguars bio

1993 births
Living people
People from Pell City, Alabama
Baseball players from Alabama
Major League Baseball pitchers
Texas Rangers players
Chicago Cubs players
Southern Union State Bison baseball players
South Alabama Jaguars baseball players
Gulf Coast Tigers players
Connecticut Tigers players
West Michigan Whitecaps players
Lakeland Flying Tigers players
Down East Wood Ducks players
Frisco RoughRiders players
Nashville Sounds players
Toledo Mud Hens players
Iowa Cubs players